Malmö was a  coaster that was built in 1918 by H C Stülcken Sohn, Hamburg, Germany for German owners. Although she sank after hitting a mine in 1942, she was salvaged and repaired and then returned to service. She was seized by the Allies in May 1945, passed to the Ministry of War Transport (MoWT) and was renamed Empire Contay. In 1947, she was sold into merchant service and renamed Reykjanes. She served until 1953 when she was scrapped.

Description
Malmö was built in 1918 by H C Stülcken Sohn, Hamburg. The ship had a GRT of 981 and a NRT of 468. The engine was built by H C Stülcken Sohn.

History
Malmö was built for Bissmark Linie GmbH, Hamburg. Her port of registry was Hamburg and she was allocated the Code Letters RWGC. In 1934, her code Letters were changed to DHQC. On 1 June 1942, Malmö struck a mine and sank south west of Malmö, Sweden. She was salvaged, repaired and returned to service. In May 1945, Malmö was seized by the Allies at Schlei. She was passed to the MoWT and renamed Empire Contay. She was placed under the management of E T Atkinson & Sons Ltd, Hull.

In 1947, Empire Contay was sold to Oddsson & Co Ltd, Hull and was renamed Reykjanes. She was sold in 1949 to Endeavour Shipping Co Ltd, serving until 1953 when she was scrapped in Rosyth, Dunbartonshire.

References

1918 ships
Ships built in Hamburg
Steamships of Germany
Merchant ships of Germany
World War II merchant ships of Germany
Ships sunk by mines
Maritime incidents in June 1942
Ministry of War Transport ships
Empire ships
Steamships of the United Kingdom
Merchant ships of the United Kingdom